General elections were held in Malaysia on 24 and 25 April 1995. Voting took place in all 192 parliamentary constituencies of Malaysia, each electing one Member of Parliament to the Dewan Rakyat, the dominant house of Parliament. State elections also took place in 394 state constituencies in 11 out of 13 states of Malaysia (except Sabah and Sarawak) on the same day.

The result was a victory for the UMNO-led Barisan Nasional, which won 162 of the 192 seats. Voter turnout was 68.3%.

Results

Results by state

Johor

Kedah

Kelantan

Kuala Lumpur

Labuan

Malacca

Negeri Sembilan

Pahang

Penang

Perak

Perlis

Sabah

Sarawak

Selangor

Terengganu

See also
1995 Malaysian state elections

References

General elections in Malaysia
Malaysia
General election
Election and referendum articles with incomplete results